Leopold Redpath (12 May 1816 - 1 May 1891) was a clerk of the Great Northern Railway Company who perpetrated a notorious fraud against his employers and was transported to Australia.

References 

1816 births
1891 deaths
People from Greenwich
English fraudsters
Convicts transported to Australia
19th-century English businesspeople